The Film Daily was a daily publication that existed from 1918 to 1970 in the United States. It was the first daily newspaper published solely for the film industry. It covered the latest trade news, film reviews, financial updates, information on court cases and union difficulties, and equipment breakthroughs.

Publication history
The publication was originated by Wid Gunning in 1913 (though not as a daily) and was known as Wid's Film and Film Folk (1915–1916) and Wid's Independent Review of Feature Films (1916–1918). Gunning was previously film editor at the New York Evening Mail. He also published Wid's Weekly, and Wid's Year Book.

In 1918, Joseph ("Danny") Dannenberg and Jack Alicoate purchased an interest in Wid's Weekly. On March 8, 1918, they released a daily publication, Wid's Daily. In 1921, Dannenberg and Alicoate took control of Wid's Films & Film Folk Inc., with Dannenberg as president and editor, and the publication changed name, in 1922, to The Film Daily.

During Dannenberg's time, the film yearbook (first published in 1918 as Wid's Year Book) expanded in size from 160 pages in 1918 to 860 pages in 1926. Dannenburg died March 11, 1926, and was succeeded as president and editor by Jack Alicoate, who also became publisher.

Chester B. Bahn became editor in 1937 but Alicoate remained as publisher until his death in 1960. Alicoate's brother Charles became executive publisher, and took over active management, a few years before Jack's death.

Jack Alicoate added another publication, Radio Daily, in February 1937. In September 1950, the publication was renamed Radio Daily-Television Daily. The publication ceased in the late 1960s.

In 1969, Charles Alicoate sold Film Daily to DFI Communications who installed Hugh Fordin as editor-in-chief and associate publisher in December 1969. After publishing the June 1, 1970 issue, production was suspended with plans to redesign and further enliven the publication.

The Film Daily Yearbook of Motion Pictures   was published in 1929, 1945, ceased with 51st edition in 1969.

Primary Source Microfilm republished the entire periodical on microfilm in 1990, in a 125 reel set. The Media History Digital Library has scans of the archive of Film Daily from 1918 to 1948 and Wid's Weekly from 1923 to 1925 available online and most years of the Film Daily Year Book (including two editions as Wid's Year Book) from 1918 to 1951.

The Internet Archive has The Film Daily, volume 5 (July 1918) to volume 70 (December 1936).

Motion Picture World, Motion Picture World Magazine Company, New York City.

Annual Critics' Poll
Film Daily was best known for its annual year-end critics' poll, in which hundreds of professional movie critics from around the country submitted their votes for the best films of the year, which the magazine then tallied and published as a top ten list. It was not uncommon for a film to win for a year that actually came after the year it first premiered, since the rollover date for each year's eligibility cycle was typically November 1 and the film was required to be in general release. Gone with the Wind, for example, premiered in 1939 but didn't become eligible until 1941 when it switched from a roadshow format to a general release. No winner was named in 1950 because for that year only, separate categories were polled for Drama of the Year and Musical of the Year (won by Sunset Boulevard and Annie Get Your Gun, respectively).

Critics' Poll Results

Further reading 

 
 https://archive.org/details/widsfilmsfilmfol02wids
 https://archive.org/details/widsfilmsfilmfol03wids
 https://archive.org/details/filmdaily72wids

References

External links

 Media History Digital Library
 "Film Daily" NOT "Year Book" NOT "Cavalcade" NOT "Presents"

Defunct newspapers published in New York (state)
Publications established in 1915
Publications disestablished in 1970
Film magazines published in the United States
Daily newspapers published in New York (state)